Andhra Kesari is a 1983 Indian Telugu-language period biographical film based on the life of Tanguturi Prakasam Panthulu, the first chief minister of the newly carved out State of Andhra Pradesh in Independent India. A co-production between Vijayachander and the Government of Andhra Pradesh. It was directed, written and produced by Vijayachander. It stars Vijayachander as Panthulu and Murali Mohan as Kandukuri Veeresalingam. The film touches upon his contributions to the Simon Go Back movement. It was released on 1 November 1983, the Andhra Pradesh Formation day. There is a melodious song Vedamla Ghoshinche Godavari Amaradhamamla Sobhille Rajamahendri on the historical city Rajamundry. The film won two Nandi Awards - Best Child Actor for Master Harish and a Special Jury Award for Vijayachander.

Cast

Production
The idea of making the film on Tanguturi Prakasam came to Vijayachander on the motivation by Tanguturi Anjaiah in one of his speeches, that Government would provide financial assistance to such ventures. After getting the script ready, he met the concerned minister and got his assurance. Later Bhavanam Venkatarami Reddy became the Chief Minister. The Finance Minister Kona Prabhakara Rao gave financial assistance of Rs. 6 lakhs on behalf of the Government of Andhra Pradesh in 1982.

The film was shot in the house of Jammaganti Hanumantha Rao, Rajahmundry and Hyderabad. The production cost was Rs. 18 lakhs. After the completion, it was released on 1 November 1983, the Formation day of Andhra Pradesh. The film was a financial failure. He could not pay the government completely and instead gave them film copyrights.

Soundtrack
 Vinara Bharata Veerakumara (Life of Andhra Kesari - Burrakatha)
 Vedamla Ghoshinche Godavari Amaradhamamla Sobhille Rajamahendri (Lyrics: Arudra; Singer: S. P. Balasubrahmanyam)

Awards
Nandi Awards - 1983
 Special Jury Award - Vijayachander
 Best Child Actor - Master Harish

References

1980s Telugu-language films
Indian biographical films
1983 films
Films scored by Satyam (composer)
1980s biographical films